Karl Anders Wall (born Andersson; 10 March 1931) is a Swedish businessman, the former chairman of Volvo.

Anders Wall was born in 1931. He was educated at the Stockholm School of Economics.

References

1931 births
Living people
Volvo people
Stockholm School of Economics alumni
People from Enköping Municipality
Members of the Royal Swedish Academy of Engineering Sciences
Members of the Royal Swedish Academy of Agriculture and Forestry
People named in the Panama Papers